Ross Island is an island in Antarctica.

Ross Island may also refer to:

 James Ross Island, near Antarctica
 Ross Island (Townsville, Queensland), Australia
 Ross Island (Oregon), in the Willamette River in Portland, Oregon, U.S.
 Ross Island (Pennsylvania), in the Allegheny River in Armstrong County, Pennsylvania, U.S.
 Rossøya or Ross Island, Norway
 Ross Island, South Andaman district, in the Andaman and Nicobar Islands in the Indian Ocean
 Ross Island, North and Middle Andaman district, in the Andaman and Nicobar Islands in the Indian Ocean
 Ross Island, Killarney, a lake island in south-west Ireland, site of the earliest Irish copper smelting
 Ross Island, Grand Manan, New Brunswick, Canada